is a Japanese category of historic preservation introduced by a 1975 amendment of the law which mandates the protection of groups of traditional buildings which, together with their environment, form a beautiful scene. They can be post towns, castle towns, mining towns, merchant quarters, ports, farming or fishing villages, etc. The Japanese government's Agency for Cultural Affairs recognizes and protects the country's cultural properties under the Law for the Protection of Cultural Properties.

Items of even higher importance are then designated  by the central government. The Agency for Cultural Affairs then provides guidance, advice, and funds for repairs and other work. Additional support is given in the form of preferential tax treatment.

As of May 31, 2021, 126 districts have been classified as Important Preservation Districts for Groups of Traditional Buildings.

List of Important Preservation Districts

Criteria
Important Preservation Districts for Groups of Traditional Buildings are designated according to three criteria:

Groups of traditional buildings that show excellent design as a whole
Groups of traditional buildings and land distribution that preserve the old state of affairs well
Groups of traditional buildings and their surrounding environment that show remarkable regional characteristics

Statistics

Usage
The table's columns (except for Remarks and Images) are sortable by table headings. The following gives an overview of what is included in the table and how the sorting works.
Name: name of the important preservation district as registered in the Database of National Cultural Properties
Type: type of the district (samurai / merchant / tea house /... quarter, post town, mountain village, mine town,...)
Criterion: number of the criterion under which the district is designated (see list of criteria above)
Area: area covered
Remarks: general remarks
Location: "town-name prefecture-name"; The column entries sort as "prefecture-name town-name".
Images: picture of the structure

List

See also
Tourism in Japan

Notes

References

Architecture in Japan

Lists of tourist attractions in Japan
Lists of buildings and structures in Japan